Bacillus stratosphericus is a microbe commonly found in high concentrations in the stratosphere. It is commonly found in the atmosphere but brought down to Earth as a result of atmospheric cycling processes. Scientists have successfully engineered it to create a biofilm which produce electricity.

References

stratosphericus
Bacteria described in 2006